Cherise Willeit (née Taylor, previously Stander; born 6 November 1989) is a South African professional road cyclist. She has won a single African and four South African championship titles, in both the road race and the time trial, and later represented her nation at the 2008 Summer Olympics. Willeit also raced for Belgium's  professional cycling team in 2011 and 2012.

Professional career
Born in Pretoria, Willeit qualified for the South African squad in the women's road race at the 2008 Summer Olympics in Beijing by receiving one of the nation's two available berths from the UCI World Cup. She successfully completed a grueling race with a fifty-ninth-place effort, finishing in 3:48:33, surpassing Cuba's Yumari González by a wide, three-minute gap. That same year, Willeit earned the women's elite road race title in her first attempt at the South African National Road Race Championships.

That year, Willeit flourished, winning two time trial events at both the South African Championships, and at the UCI African Continental Championships in Asmara, Eritrea.

Willeit also sought her bid for the 2012 Summer Olympics in London, but the South African Sports Confederation and Olympic Committee (SASCOC) excluded her from the team. Moreover, Cycling South Africa decided to reject her appeal based on the board's scrutiny and decision in the due process and procedures for the national team's final selection.

Personal life
Willeit married elite mountain biker and African under-23 champion Burry Stander in May 2012. Stander was killed during a collision with a taxi while training near his residence in Shelly Beach the following year. She later married Benjamin Willeit and became a mother to a son.

Major results

2006
 2nd  Road race, African Junior Road Championships
 6th Road race, UCI Juniors World Championships
2007
 UCI Juniors World Championships
2nd  Road race
10th Time trial
2008
 1st  Road race, National Road Championships
 7th Overall Tour of Chongming Island
1st Stage 4
2009
 2nd  Road race, African Road Championships
 3rd Road race, National Road Championships
2010
 1st  Road race, National Road Championships
 7th Overall Women's Tour of New Zealand
 10th Road race, Commonwealth Games
2011
 African Road Championships
1st  Road race
2nd  Time trial
 National Road Championships
1st  Time trial
3rd Road race
 10th Ronde van Gelderland
2012
 1st  Time trial, National Road Championships
 1st Stage 2 La Route de France
2014
 2nd Road race, National Road Championships
2015
 KZN Autumn Series
1st PMB Road Classic
1st Hibiscus Cycle Classic
 2nd Time trial, National Road Championships

References

External links
Profile – Ultimate Sports Nutrition

1989 births
Living people
South African female cyclists
Cyclists at the 2008 Summer Olympics
Olympic cyclists of South Africa
Sportspeople from Pretoria
White South African people